Julieanne Newbould (born 1957) is an Australian actress who first came to prominence in the 1970s.

Newbould was 16 years old when she played Karen in the 1974 ABC telemovie Lindsay’s Boy. She then worked in several television series for the Grundy Organisation, and in 1977 played a guest role in the soap opera, The Young Doctors, and then became a popular original cast member of The Restless Years. This  series started in late 1977 and Newbould left in early 1979. She later played two roles in another Grundy series, Prisoner. She appeared first in 1982 as Hannah Simpson and then 1986 as Wendy Glover. She was also a regular in the soap opera, E Street, First Appeared on E-street in 1989 as a court lawyer then later on played Virginia Travis in 1991. Her character was the first victim of "Mr Bad", in a serial-killer storyline.

Television roles
Newbould's other TV credits include Number 96 (in 1977), Homicide, Division 4, Matlock Police, Bluey, Kingswood Country, The Flying Doctors, All Saints, Farscape, Home and Away, White Collar Blue, and The Cut.

Theatre 
Newbould's theatre credits include Nicholas Nickleby (Sydney Theatre Company), Tribute (Theatre Royal), Gypsy (Queensland Theatre Company) and On our Selection (Nimrod).

Personal
Since 1999, her partner has been former Prime Minister of Australia Paul Keating. She has been married and has two daughters from that relationship.

Filmography

References

External links
 

1957 births
Living people
Australian film actresses
Australian soap opera actresses
Australian stage actresses
20th-century Australian actresses
21st-century Australian actresses